Köchübaev is a village in Aravan District, Osh Region of Kyrgyzstan. Its population was 6,390 in 2021.

Population

References

Populated places in Osh Region